Syvertsen is a surname. Notable people with the surname include:

Frode Syvertsen (born 1963), Norwegian speed skater
Håvard Syvertsen (born 1962), Norwegian novelist and short story writer
Olaf Syvertsen (1884–1964), Norwegian gymnast
Ryder Syvertsen (1941–2015), American author
Tuva Syvertsen (born 1983), Norwegian musician